Jensen is a surname of Scandinavian origin meaning son of Jens. In 2001 it was the most common surname in Denmark, but nowadays it is the second most common surname in Denmark, where it is shared by about 5% of the population. It is also very common in other Scandinavian countries such as Norway, where it is the ninth most common surname, but nevertheless shared by about 5% of the population. The name is also in use in the Faroe Islands.

There was no "Jensen family," merely a system of patronymics that was finally fixed in the 19th century at an arbitrary time, when the state bureaucracy required family names; before that people took their name from their father's first name.

List of persons with the surname

A
Adolf Jensen (1837–1879), composer
Al Jensen (born 1958)
 Anabel Jensen, American educator and author
 Anders Thomas Jensen (born 1972)
 Anne Elisabet Jensen (born 1951)
 Arthur Jensen (actor) (1897–1981)
 Arthur Jensen (1923–2012)
 Ashley Jensen (born 1969), British actress
 Axel Jensen (1932–2003)

B
 Betty Lou Jensen
 Bhumi Jensen (1983–2004)
 Bjarne Jensen (umpire) (born 1958), Danish cricket umpire
 Bjørg Eva Jensen (born 1960)
 Brian Jensen (footballer born 1968), Danish football defender
 Brian Jensen (footballer born 1975), Danish football goalkeeper
 Benjamin Jensen (born 1975)
 Barry Jensen (born 1954), rugby league footballer

C
 Captain C. W. Jensen, American policeman
 Carsten Jensen (born 1952)
 Christian Jensen (disambiguation)
 Christoffer Jensen 
 Claus Jensen (born 1977)
 Cornelius Jensen (1814–1886), sea captain and politician

D
 Daniel Jensen (born 1979), Danish footballer
 Darren Jensen (born 1960)
 David Jensen (born 1950)
 David A. Jensen (born 1965)
 Debra Jensen (born 1958)
 Dennis Jensen (born 1962)
 Derrick Jensen (born 1960)
 Dick Jensen (1942–2006) Hawaiian entertainer
 Ditte Jensen (born 1980)
 Doron Jensen (born 1958), American restaurateur 
 Dorte Juul Jensen
 Dwight Jensen
 David Jensen (born 1982), American investment advisor

E
   (1928-1985), Danish politician. 
 Eirik Jensen (born 1957), Norwegian drug trafficker and former policeman 
 Elaine Jensen (born 1955)
 Elín Metta Jensen (born 1995) Icelandic footballer
 Elwood V. Jensen (1920–2012), American biologist
 Eric Jensen (disambiguation), several people
 Erik Jensen (disambiguation), several people
 Erik Flensted-Jensen (1908–1993)
 Eugen Jensen (1871-1957)
 Eulalie Jensen (1884–1952)
 Eva Skafte Jensen (born 1966), Danish linguist

F
 Frank Jensen (born 1961)

G
 Georg Jensen (1866–1935), Danish silversmith
 Gurli Vibe Jensen (1924–2016), Danish missionary, priest and writer
 Gyde Jensen (born 1989), German politician

H
 J. Hans D. Jensen (1907–1973)
 Hayley Jensen (born 1983)
 Hedvig Antoinette Isabella Eleonore Jensen, known as Elvira Madigan
 Heike Jensen (born 1965), German volleyball player
 Helene Jensen, Danish curler
 Henning Munk Jensen (born 1947)
 Henrik Wann Jensen (born 1970)

I
 Ingrid Jensen (born 1966)

J

 Jackie Jensen (1927–1982)
 Jacob Jensen
 James A. Jensen (1918–1998)
 Jan Krogh Jensen (1958–1996), Danish gangster
 Jane Jensen (born 1963)
 Jane Jensen (cricketer)
 Jane Jensen (musician) (born 1968)
 Jay E. Jensen (born 1942)
 Jeffrey Jensen (born 1965/1966)
 Jelena Jensen (born 1981)
 Jens Jensen (politician) (1865–1936)
 Jens Jensen (landscape architect) (1860–1951)
 Jens Fink-Jensen (born 1956)
 Jesper B. Jensen (born 1977), speedway rider
 Jim Jensen (disambiguation), several people
 Joakim Jensen, Norwegian ice hockey player
 Johan Jensen (1898–1983), Danish boxer
 Johan Jensen (1859–1925), Danish mathematician
 Johannes Jensen (aviator) (1898-1978), flying ace
 Johannes Vilhelm Jensen (1873–1950)
 John Jensen (disambiguation), several people, also Jon Jensen, Jonathan Jensen and Johnny Jensen
 Jorgen Arendt Jensen, Danish engineer
 Jørgen Jensen (1944–2009)
 Jørgen Christian Jensen
 Judy Jensen (born 1953)

K
 Karen Jensen (born 1944), American actress
 Karolina Jensen (born 2003), Danish curler
 Kirsa Jensen, New Zealand girl who disappeared in 1983
 Kirsten Jensen (curler) (born 1952), Danish curler and coach
 Klavs F. Jensen (born 1952), chemical engineer
 Kris Jensen (born 1942), musician

L
 Larsen Jensen (born 1985)
 Lasse Jensen, professor of  chemistry 
 Leland Jensen (1914–1996)
 Leslie Jensen (1892–1964)
 Louise Jensen (1971–1994), Danish murder victim
 Luke Jensen (born 1966), American tennis player

M
 Marcus Jensen (born 1972),  American baseball player and coach
 Maren Jensen (born 1956), American model and actress
 Marie-Louise Jensen (born 1964), English author
 Mark Jensen (born 1976), American football player
 Marlin K. Jensen (born 1942), LDS church historian
 Martin Jensen (disambiguation), several people
 Merrill Jensen (1905–1980), American historian
 Michael C. Jensen (born 1939), economist
 Michael Jepsen Jensen (born 1992), speedway rider
 Mikkel Jensen (footballer born 1977)
 Morten Jensen (disambiguation)
 Murphy Jensen (born 1968)

N
 Niclas Jensen (born 1974), Danish footballer and football agent
 Nicklas Jensen (born 1993), Danish ice hockey player
 Nicolaj Jensen (born 1994), gamer
 Niels Peter Jensen (1802–1846), Danish composer and musician
 Nils Riddervold Jensen (1863–1938), Norwegian politician

O
 Otto Jensen (bishop) (1856–1918), Norwegian Lutheran bishop and politician

P
 Patrik Jensen (born 1969), Swedish guitarist
 Paul Hilmar Jenson (1930–2004), Norwegian philatelist
 Peter Jensen (bishop) (born 1943), Australian Anglican theologian and academic
 Peter Skov-Jensen (born 1971), Danish footballer and goalkeeper
 Phillip Jensen, Australian Anglican cleric
 Ploypailin Mahidol Jensen (born 1981), American pianist
 Poul Jensen (footballer born 1899) (1899–1991), Danish footballer
 Poul Jensen (footballer born 1934) (1934–2000), Danish footballer

R
 Rasmus Jensen (priest) (died 1620), Danish Lutheran priest
 Rasmus Jensen (speedway rider) (born 1993), Danish motorcycle rider
 Richard A. Jensen (1934–2014), American theologian
 Richard J. Jensen (born 1941), American historian
 Roald Jensen (1943–1987), Norwegian footballer
 Robert C. Jensen (1928-2011), American farmer and politician
 Robert W. Jensen (born 1958), American professor of journalism and activist
 Robert Jensen (television personality), Dutch DJ
 Rod Jensen (born 1979), Australian rugby league footballer
 Roger Jensen (1933–2001), American photographer
 Ronald Björn Jensen (born 1936), American mathematician
 Roy C. Jensen (1909–2011), American farmer and politician
 Ryan Jensen (born 1991), NFL player

S
 Scott Jensen (Wisconsin politician) (born 1960), American politician
 Scott Jensen (Minnesota politician) (born 1954), American politician
 Shelley Jensen, American television director and producer
 Sirikitiya Jensen (born 1985), Thai royal
 Siv Jensen (born 1969), leader of the Norwegian Progress Party
 Søren Gade Jensen (born 1963), Danish politician and Defence Minister
 Sririta Jensen (born 1981), Thai model and actress
 Steve Jensen (born 1955), ice hockey player

T
 Thit Jensen (1876–1957), Danish writer
 Thomas Jensen (1898–1963), Danish orchestra conductor
 Tine Jensen (born 1957), Norwegian psychologist 
 Todd Jensen, American bass guitarist
 Tomas Villum Jensen (born 1971), Danish actor and film director

U
 Uffe Ellemann-Jensen (born 1941), Danish minister of foreign affairs

V
 Vernon K. Jensen (1912-1982), American veterinarian and politician
 Viggo Jensen (disambiguation), several people
 Viktor Jensen (born 1987), Icelandic/British race car driver

W
 Whitney Jensen (born 1992), American ballet dancer
 Wilhelm Jensen (1837–1911), German writer and poet
 Woody Jensen (1907–2001), American college baseball coach

Fictional characters
Clay Jensen, a character in the novel and series 13 Reasons Why
Adam Jensen, a character in the video game series Deus Ex

Molly Jensen,  lead female character played by Demi Moore in the 1990 film Ghost

See also
 Jensen (disambiguation)
 Jenssen

References 

Danish-language surnames
Norwegian-language surnames
Patronymic surnames
Surnames from given names
ca:Jensen
fr:Jensen
it:Jensen
pt:Jensen
ru:Йенсен
sl:Jensen
fi:Jensen